Transgression is a 1974 South Korean film directed by Kim Ki-young.

Plot
Based on a novel by Ko Un, the film tells the story of two students of Zen Buddhism.

Cast
Choi Bool-am
Park Byeong-ho
Jo Jae-seong
Im Ye-jin

References

Bibliography

External links

Films about Buddhism
Films directed by Kim Ki-young
1970s Korean-language films
South Korean drama films